Kyzyl-Yulduz (Qıźıl Yondoź) is a rural locality (a village) in Yanyshevsky Selsoviet, Blagovarsky District, Bashkortostan, Russia. The population was 51 as of 2010. There is 1 street.

Geography 
Kyzyl-Yulduz is located 35 km north of Yazykovo (the district's administrative centre) by road. Neyfeld is the nearest rural locality.

References 

Rural localities in Blagovarsky District